Man Bahadur Gurung is a Bhutanese international footballer who currently plays for Druk Star. He made his first appearance for the Bhutan national football team in 2011.

References

Bhutanese footballers
Bhutan international footballers
Living people
Association football forwards
Year of birth missing (living people)
Bhutanese people of Nepalese descent
Gurung people